Moving Midway is a 2007 American documentary film directed by film critic Godfrey Cheshire. The film follows Cheshire's cousin Charlie moving the Midway Plantation House and Outbuildings to a new location, and what the Midway means to his family and other groups. The film was shot around 2005 and premiered at the Full Frame Documentary Film Festival on April 14, 2007, followed by a limited release on September 12, 2008.

Plot summary 
Godfrey Cheshire is an American film critic who had helped found Raleigh's Spectator Magazine and written for various publications such as The New York Times and more. In early 2004, he learns that his cousin Charlie wants to move the buildings of Midway Plantation. The documentary features interviews with many of the family members, who worry that moving the buildings would destroy Midway. Cheshire learns about the African-American branch of Midway, and reaches out to a NYU professor, Dr. Robert Hinton, who shows him a new perspective on the Midway.

The film features excerpts from Gone with the Wind, The Birth of a Nation, The Littlest Rebel, Jezebel, Song of the South, Uncle Tom's Cabin, and Roots, among others. Blues songs were performed by Algia Mae Hinton.

Reception 
The film has received very positive reviews. It features a 100% on Rotten Tomatoes with the Critic Consensus reading, "This strange, heartfelt documentary from film critic Godfrey Cheshire is a fascinating examination of his family roots, as well as an evocative meditation on the complexities of the South." Roger Ebert gave the film 3 out of 4 stars, claiming that "it starts in one direction and discovers a better one. Cheshire is a dry, almost dispassionate narrator, and that is good; preaching about his discoveries would sound wrong." LA Weekly named it the 9th best film of 2008 along with The Order of Myths. Andrew Sarris of New York Observer named it the 2nd best non-fiction film of the year.

External links 
 Official site

References 

2007 films
American documentary films
Films shot in North Carolina
First Run Features films
2000s English-language films
2000s American films